Ptiloprora is a genus of birds in the honeyeater family Meliphagidae that are endemic to New Guinea.

The genus contains six species:
 Leaden honeyeater (Ptiloprora plumbea)
 Yellowish-streaked honeyeater (Ptiloprora meekiana)
 Rufous-sided honeyeater (Ptiloprora erythropleura)
 Rufous-backed honeyeater (Ptiloprora guisei)
 Mayr's honeyeater (Ptiloprora mayri)
 Grey-streaked honeyeater (Ptiloprora perstriata)

References

 
Bird genera
 
Taxonomy articles created by Polbot